Roanne is a commune in the Loire department, central France.

It has an important Museum, the Musée des Beaux-arts et d'Archéologie Joseph-Déchelette (French), with many Egyptian artifacts.

Economy
Roanne is known for gastronomy (largely because of the famous Troisgros family), textiles, agriculture and manufacturing tanks.

Roanne station has rail connections to Clermont-Ferrand, Saint-Étienne, Moulins and Lyon.

History

The toponymy is Gaulish, Rod-Onna ("flowing water") which became Rodumna, then Rouhanne and Roanne. The town was sited at a strategic point, the head of navigation on the Loire, below its narrow gorges. As a trans-shipping point, its importance declined with the collapse of long-distance trade after the fourth century. In the twelfth century, the site passed to the comte du Forez, under whose care it began to recover. An overland route led to Lyon and the Rhône, thus Roanne developed as a transshipping point between Paris and the Mediterranean in early modern France, when waterways were at least as important as roads.

The renewed navigation on the Loire encouraged the export of local products— wines, including casks of Beaujolais that had been shipped overland, ceramics, textiles—and after 1785, coal from Saint-Étienne, which had formerly been onloaded upstream at Saint-Rambert, since river improvements at the beginning of the century. Sturdy goods were rafted downriver on sapinières that were dismantled after use. Half the population of seventeenth and eighteenth-century Roanne depended in some way on this transportation economy: merchants and factors, carriers, carpenters and coopers, master-boatmen and their journeymen and oarsmen, and waterfront laborers (Braudel p360f).

Roanne was one of the first towns served by railroad, with the opening, 15 March 1833, of the terminal on the right bank at the port of Varennes of the third line, from Andrézieux. Following came the opening of the canal from Roanne to Digoin (1838), which placed the city in the forefront of the French Industrial Revolution.

In 1917 the arsenal was established at Roanne, and from 1940 a new industry developed, producing rayon and other new fibers. In the post-industrial phase that set in during the 1970s, Roanne struggled to find new industry and attract tourism.

The 18th-century actor, playwright and revolutionary Antoine Dorfeuille (1754–1795) was murdered in Roanne.

Population

Sports
The city is home to Chorale Roanne Basket, two-time champion of France's top basketball league LNB Pro A. The team plays its home games at the Halle André Vacheresse.

Personalities
Roanne was the birthplace of:

 Édouard Carpentier, (1926-2010) professional wrestler
 Laurent Chabry (1855-1894), biologist who worked in the flying mechanisms of birds and insects
 Jean-Baptiste Nompère de Champagny (1756–1834) was a French politician
 Joseph Déchelette (1862-1914), archaeologist
 Henri Dentz (1881-1945), French Army officer and collaborator
 Pierre Étaix (born 1928), film director
 Jean-Pierre Jeunet (born 1953), film director
 René Leriche (1870–1955), surgeon
 David Ramseyer, basketball player
 Antoine Vermorel-Marques (born 1993), Member of Parliament

Twin towns – sister cities

Roanne is twinned with:

 Guadalajara, Spain
 Legnica, Poland
 Montevarchi, Italy
 Nuneaton and Bedworth, United Kingdom
 Piatra Neamţ, Romania
 Reutlingen, Germany

References

Sources
Braudel, Fernand, 1982. The Wheels of Commerce, vol. II of Civilization and Capitalism p. 360.

External links
 

 
Communes of Loire (department)
Subprefectures in France
Segusiavi
Forez